Tavia is a genus of moths of the family Erebidae. The genus was erected by Francis Walker in 1858.

Species
Tavia albilinea Walker, 1865 Bengal
Tavia instruens Walker, 1858 Zaire, Kenya, South Africa
Tavia latebra Hampson, 1926 Mozambique, South Africa
Tavia nana Hampson, 1926 southern Nigeria
Tavia nycterina (Boisduval, 1833) São Tome, Cameroon, Zaire, Kenya, Mozambique, South Africa, Zambia, Madagascar
Tavia nyctombra Hampson, 1926 Sierra Leone
Tavia plicata Hampson, 1910
Tavia polycyma Hampson, 1926 Sierra Leone, Cameroon, Zaire

References

Calpinae